Tomasz Bernard Zieliński (born 29 October 1990 in Nakło nad Notecią) is a Polish weightlifter. He won gold at the 2016 European Championships in the −94 kg category.

Personal life
Zieliński was born 29 October 1990 in Nakło nad Notecią. He is the brother of Adrian Zieliński, who is also a weightlifter.

Career
Zieliński represented Poland at the 2012 Summer Olympics in London. He placed 9th in the men's 94 kg event but was eventually awarded the bronze medal as 6 athletes ahead him tested positive for performance-enhancing drugs when their 2012 samples were retested in 2016.

Competing in the −94 kg category, Zieliński won silver at the 2014 European Championships in Tel Aviv and gold at the 2016 European Championships in Førde. He was included in Poland's squad to the 2016 Summer Olympics after the national weightlifting federation's board over-ruled its own president, Szymon Kołecki, who had wanted him off the team after Zieliński decided to train outside the federation's framework. At the Olympics in Rio, Zieliński tested positive for spironolactone and was sent home.

References

External links
 
 
 
 

1990 births
Living people
Polish male weightlifters
Weightlifters at the 2012 Summer Olympics
Olympic weightlifters of Poland
People from Nakło nad Notecią
Sportspeople from Kuyavian-Pomeranian Voivodeship
Doping cases in weightlifting
Polish sportspeople in doping cases
European Weightlifting Championships medalists
Olympic medalists in weightlifting
Medalists at the 2012 Summer Olympics
20th-century Polish people
21st-century Polish people